Agir Karadagi ( - meaning heavy Karadakhi) is Azerbaijani melody of a dance that is created in Karadakh. 

It is very popular in the cities Shaki and Zaqatala in northwestern Azerbaijan, and performed slowly.

References

Azerbaijani culture
Azerbaijani dances